Luis Emilio Solignac (born 16 February 1991) is an Argentine professional footballer who plays as a forward for USL Championship side El Paso Locomotive.

Career
During the 2013 pre-season, he was signed on loan from Club Atlético Platense. Solignac made his Djurgårdens IF debut in Svenska Cupen on 3 March 2013 against Umeå FC. He scored his only league goal for Djurgården when he equalized to 2–2 home against Malmö FF on 12 May 2013.

Colorado Rapids
Solignac signed for the Colorado Rapids of Major League Soccer in May 2015.

Chicago Fire
Solignac was traded to Chicago Fire on 3 August 2016 in exchange for allocation money. He was immediately integrated into Chicago's starting lineup, playing his first full 90 minutes for the team just three days after his trade. He started in all but two of Chicago's remaining matches for the season. He only failed to see minutes in Chicago's final game of the season, due to a red card suspension he had received in the prior match after a trip off the ball.

In 2017, Solignac began the season with a career-high four goals and three assists through just the first 15 games, leading an MLSsoccer.com writer to credit him as a driving force behind Chicago's 8-game unbeaten streak. Solignac would remain a regular starter for the rest of the season.

Solignac started in the first two matches of Chicago's 2018 season, but suffered a quadriceps strain that forced him out of action for an estimated 6–8 weeks. He made his return as a late substitute in a May 30 match against Philadelphia Union. He returned to his starting role for a few matches, but never to play a full 90 minutes, and he began to spend more matches on the bench than in previous years with Chicago. Solignac saw his first full 90 minutes of play time since the injury on August 4 in an away match against Real Salt Lake.

Solignac was released by Chicago at the end of their 2018 season.

San Antonio FC
On January 31, 2020, San Antonio FC announced that they had signed Solignac for the 2020 USL Championship season.

El Paso Locomotive FC
On February 4, 2021, El Paso Locomotive FC announced that they had signed Solignac for the 2021 USL Championship season. On May 26, 2021, Solignac set an El Paso Locomotive club record for fastest goal, scoring just 18 seconds into the match against Rio Grande Valley FC Toros. After a successful first season with the club, El Paso announced that they had re-signed Solignac for the 2022 season on December 8, 2021. On August 16, 2022, Solignac was named USL Championship player of the week for week 23 of the 2022 season, after scoring two goals and an assist against Colorado Springs Switchbacks FC.

Career statistics

References

External links
 
 IFK Mariehamn profile
 Eliteprospects profile
 

Living people
1991 births
Association football forwards
Argentine footballers
Argentine expatriate footballers
Club Atlético Platense footballers
Djurgårdens IF Fotboll players
IFK Mariehamn players
Nueva Chicago footballers
Colorado Rapids players
Chicago Fire FC players
San Antonio FC players
San Luis de Quillota footballers
El Paso Locomotive FC players
Allsvenskan players
Veikkausliiga players
Major League Soccer players
Expatriate footballers in Sweden
Expatriate footballers in Finland
Expatriate soccer players in the United States
Argentine people of French descent
Footballers from Buenos Aires